Warmer in the Winter is the fourth studio album and first Christmas album by violinist and composer Lindsey Stirling, released on October 20, 2017. The album features Becky G, Trombone Shorty, Alex Gaskarth of All Time Low, and Sabrina Carpenter. The album is composed of ten Christmas cover tracks and three original tracks. The album opened at #32 on the Billboard 200, selling 15,000 copies, making her fourth Top 40 album. The deluxe edition, which features five bonus tracks, was released on October 19, 2018.

Track listing 

Notes

  signifies a co-producer
  signifies a vocal producer

Critical reception 

AllMusic gave Warmer in the Winter three stars out of five, with reviewer James Christopher Monger writing that "Stirling has crafted a fun and flighty brew of modern holiday cheer that is most certainly of its time".

Charts

Weekly charts

Year end charts

Music videos

See also 
 List of Billboard Top Holiday Albums number ones of the 2010s

References

2017 Christmas albums
Lindsey Stirling albums
Concord Records albums
Christmas albums by American artists
Classical Christmas albums